Anthony Zielinski was an American politician, he was replaced as Milwaukee's Fourteenth District Alderman on the Milwaukee Common Council by Marina Dimitrijevic.

Early life and education
Alderman Zielinski attended St. John's Northwestern Military Academy in Delafield, Wisconsin, graduating in 1979 with the school's student rank of Second Lieutenant. He received a Bachelor of Arts degree in political science from the University of Wisconsin–Milwaukee, a master of business administration degree from Cardinal Stritch University, and a juris doctor degree from Marquette University Law School.

Career
Alderman Zielinski was first elected to the Milwaukee County Board of Supervisors from the 12th District in 1988 and was re-elected in 1992, 1996, and 2000. He served as chair of the Judiciary, Safety and General Services Committee and as a member of the Personnel Committee. 

He was elected to the Milwaukee, Wisconsin Common Council as Alderman of the 14th District in April 2004, and he won re-election in April 2008 with 84% of the vote. Zielinski was reelected again in 2012, and in April 2016.

He ran unsuccessfully in the 2020 Milwaukee mayoral election.

Personal life
Zielinski is a health enthusiast who enjoys jogging and lifting weights. Reading and playing chess are
two other areas of interest. This latter interest culminated in his winning the Conference Chess Championship in school. He completed the Badgerland Striders South Shore Half Marathon in 2006.

References

External links
Alderman Tony Zielinski official government website

1961 births
Living people
Politicians from Milwaukee
Lawyers from Milwaukee
Wisconsin Democrats
County supervisors in Wisconsin
Wisconsin city council members
University of Wisconsin–Milwaukee alumni
Cardinal Stritch University alumni
Marquette University Law School alumni